Cosmin Florin Achim (born 19 September 1995) is a Romanian footballer who plays as a defender.

Honours
FC Voluntari
Liga II:  2014–15
Liga III: 2013–14
Cupa României: 2016–17
Supercupa României: 2017

References

External links
 
 

1995 births
Living people
People from Drăgănești-Olt
Romanian footballers
Association football defenders
Liga I players
FC Voluntari players
Liga II players
Liga III players
ACS Viitorul Târgu Jiu players
FC Petrolul Ploiești players